Thomas Witherby (1719 – 26 November 1797) was the founder of Witherby's, now known as the Witherby Publishing Group, one of the oldest publishing companies in the United Kingdom.  In 1740, he opened a stationer's shop at 9 Birchin Lane, London next door to the Sword Blade coffee house. The family business grew into a printing business, a publisher specializing in marine subjects, a bookshop and other businesses.

In 1767 he was elected to the Council of the City of London Corporation representing Langbourn Ward.

References

1719 births
1797 deaths
English magazine editors
English book publishers (people)